Gjesåsen Church is a parish church of the Church of Norway in Åsnes Municipality in Innlandet county, Norway. It is located in the village of Gjesåsen. It is the church for the Gjesåsen parish which is part of the Solør, Vinger og Odal prosti (deanery) in the Diocese of Hamar. The white, wooden church was built in a long church design in 1863 using plans drawn up by the architect Peter Høier Holtermann. The church seats about 300 people.

History
In the 1860s, planning began for a new church in Gjesåsen. The church was designed by Peter Høier Holtermann. It is a wooden long church with a rectangular nave, a narrower chancel on the east end with a lower roof line, and a tower with a church porch at the foot of the tower on the west end of the nave. The new building was consecrated on 16 December 1863. In 1945, the choir was rebuilt. In 1954, a sacristy was built on the south side of the choir.

See also
List of churches in Hamar

References

Åsnes
Churches in Innlandet
Long churches in Norway
Wooden churches in Norway
19th-century Church of Norway church buildings
Churches completed in 1863
1863 establishments in Norway